Frank Monroe Clark (December 24, 1915 – June 17, 2003) was a Democratic member of the U.S. House of Representatives from Pennsylvania.

Early life & military service
Frank Clark was born in Bessemer, Pennsylvania. He attended the Pittsburgh Institute of Aeronautics, and enlisted in the United States Army Air Corps in 1942, serving in Europe as a flight officer until discharged in 1945. Clark later became a major in the Air Force Reserve.

Public service
While still in the service, Clark was appointed as the chief of police of Bessemer, serving in that capacity until November 1954.

He was an unsuccessful candidate for election to Congress in 1952.  He was elected as a Democrat in 1954 to the 84th United States Congress, defeating incumbent Republican Congressman Louis E. Graham, and was re-elected to the nine succeeding Congresses, serving until his resignation on December 31, 1974, following his defeat in the 1974 election to Republican Gary A. Myers.

After his loss to Myers, Clark continued to send massive amounts of mail to his former constituents stating they were from 'your Congressman Frank M. Clark' when he had been out of office for five months. Clark won only 34 of 244 votes for the post of Clerk of the House.

He pleaded guilty to mail fraud and tax evasion on February 13, 1979. He was unsuccessful seeking re-election in 1976, 1978, 1986, and 1990.

He was a delegate to a number of conferences, including:
 the North Atlantic Treaty Organization Conference 1956–1974
 the Inter-Parliamentary Union Conference in Germany in 1957
 the Christian Leadership for Peace Conference at The Hague in 1958
 the International Roads Conference in 1959 and 1962–1968.

He died in New Castle, Pennsylvania, on June 17, 2003.

See also
List of American federal politicians convicted of crimes
List of federal political scandals in the United States

References

External links
 Retrieved on 2008-01-24

1915 births
2003 deaths
20th-century American politicians
American municipal police chiefs
American people convicted of tax crimes
Democratic Party members of the United States House of Representatives from Pennsylvania
Military personnel from Pennsylvania
People from Lawrence County, Pennsylvania
Pennsylvania politicians convicted of crimes
Politicians convicted of mail and wire fraud
United States Air Force officers
United States Air Force reservists
United States Army Air Forces officers
United States Army Air Forces personnel of World War II